Miled Faiza (born 1974) is a Tunisian-American writer.

Career 

Miled Faiza was born in Monastir, Tunisia in 1974. He published his first book of poetry in 2004 and his poetry has been translated into English, French, Spanish and Serbian.

Faiza is also a translator; his translation of Ali Smith's Autumn was published as al-Kharīf in 2018 and he has also published many translations of American poems into Arabic.

In addition to writing, he was a reviewing editor of the Oxford Arabic Dictionary (2014), and is the co-creator of the Tunisian Arabic Corpus. He has taught Arabic in the United States since 2006 and currently teaches at Brown University.

Poetry collections 

 (2019) ʾAṣābiʿ al-naḥḥāt ( (The sculptor's fingers))
 (2004) Baqayā al-bayt alladhī dakhalnāhā maratan wāḥida ( (Remains of a house we only entered once)

Translations 
 (2021) The Italian, translation (with Karen McNeil) of Shukri Mabkhout novel al-Talyānī
(2019) al-Shitāʾ , translation of Ali Smith novel Winter
(2017) al-Kharīf, translation of Ali Smith novel Autumn

References

20th-century Tunisian poets
American people of Tunisian descent
1974 births
Living people
21st-century Tunisian poets
American Arabic-language poets